Chapaize is a commune in the Saône-et-Loire department in the region of Bourgogne-Franche-Comté in eastern France.

Sights
It features a Romanesque church built in the 11th century, in lombard style, surrounded by stone-built houses with the typical covered galleries of this region with a 16th-century watch tower. In the hamlet of Lancharre, there is a church of the 12th century, remains of a canonnesse's monastery.

Around Chapaize lie a large state and communal forest and two ponds. In the 4 hamlets of Chapaize (Bessuge, Gemaugue, Lancharre and Chapaize), there are several laundrettes which were still used at the beginning of the 1950s.

See also
Communes of the Saône-et-Loire department

References

External links

 
www.chapaize.org
www.art-roman.net/chapaize.htm
Pictures of the church
Chapaize on the site Bourgogne Romane

Communes of Saône-et-Loire